Golapi Ekhon Bilatey is a 2010 Bangladeshi film written and directed by Amjad Hussain. It stars Mithun Chakraborty, Moushumi, Shabnur, Ferdous Ahmed, Prabir Mitra and Ahmed Sharif. Amjad Hussain directed two other films before, Golapi Ekhon Traine (1978), Golapi Ekhon Dhaka e (1995) and they are not the prequel of this film. The filming of Golapi Ekhon Bilatey began in May 2006 and it was released on 29 January 2010 in Bangladesh.

Snippets
The film was shot at the below mentioned locations:
 Dhaka, Bangladesh
 Houses of Parliament, Westminster, London, England, UK
 Southend-on-Sea, Essex, England, UK
 Trafalgar Square, St James's, London, England, UK

Cast
 Mithun Chakraborty
 Moushumi
 Shabnur
 Ferdous Ahmed

References

External links
 
 Golapi Ekhon Bilatey at the Bangla Movie Database

Bengali-language Bangladeshi films
Bangladeshi musical drama films
Golapi (film series)
2010s musical drama films
2010s Bengali-language films
2010 drama films
2010 films
Films directed by Amjad Hossain